Horizons is the fourth studio album by American rock band Starset. It was released on October 22, 2021.

Critical reception 

Horizons has received positive reviews. Sonic Perspectivess Josh Muncke writes, "Horizons is truly a step forward for Starset, and arguably a demonstration of them at their best. They've taken their past releases and distilled them all into an optimised collection of tracks, whilst introducing some new ideas to continue the concept narrative." Wall of Sound lauded the album, singling out the tracks "Otherworldly," "Icarus," and "Symbiotic" as highlights. Writing for Kerrang!, Steve Beebee opines that "[t]he galactic sense of scale in Horizons’ orchestration enables all sixteen tracks to massage the emotions" and praises Starset for "explor[ing] our vulnerability, our very humanity."

Track listing

PersonnelMusicians Dustin Bates – Lead vocals
 Jasen Rauch – Guitar, Bass
 Isaiah Perez – Drums
 Lester Estelle – Drums on "Disappear" and "infected"
 Joe Rickard, Alex Niceforo – Programming
 Garrison Turner – Additional programming on "The Breach", "Dreamcatcher" and "This Endless Endeavor"
 Paul Trust – Additional programming on "Devolution", "Earthrise" and "Icarus"
 Sahaj Ticotin – Additional programming on "Otherworldly" and "Annihiliated Love"
 Igor Khoroshev – Additional programming on "Infected"
 David Davidson, Conni Ellisor, David Angell, Carrie Bailey, Elizabeth Lamb – Violins
 Seanad Chang – Viola
 Paul Nelson – CelloManagement Andy Serrao and Cody Demavivas for Fearless Records – A&R
 Marc Mutnansky for Fearless – Product ManagementProduction Joe Rickard – Producer, Engineer
 Dustin Bates – Executive Producer
 Jasen Rauch – Drums engineering
 Patrick Prophet – Drums assistant engineer
 Dan Lancaster – Mixing
 Niels Nielsen – Mastering
 Alex Niceforo – Programming
 Mike "Cowboy" Warren – Guitar technician
 Taylor Pollert, Josh Keith – Engineers
 Paul Trust – Strings Arrangement and Interludes
 Paul Nelson, Steve Mauldin – Transcriptions and Score preparationArtwork TNSN DVSN – Art direction & Package design
 Jake Wangner – Cover photoNotes'
 All track titles are stylized in all uppercase.

Charts

References

2021 albums
Starset albums